Tim Hunt (born 23 May 1960) is a former speedway rider from England.

Speedway career 
Hunt reached the final of the British Speedway Championship in 1985. He rode in the top tier of British Speedway from 1978–1985, riding for various clubs.

References 

1960 births
Living people
British speedway riders
Canterbury Crusaders riders
Ipswich Witches riders
Peterborough Panthers riders
Reading Racers riders
Swindon Robins riders